Jiantan (formerly transliterated as Chientan Station until 2003) is a metro station in Taipei, Taiwan served by Taipei Metro. There was a station of the same name on the now-defunct Tamsui railway line, however the position was different; the TRA station was further south.

Station overview

The two-level, elevated station structure with one island platform and two side exits. The washrooms are inside the entrance area. Notable landmarks are National Revolutionary Martyrs' Shrine, Jiantan Park and Ming Chuan University.

This station is well known for its architecture, which is based on a dragon boat. The station is also next to the Shilin Night Market and experiences heavy traffic during the evening hours.

Due to its unique dragon boat architecture, it was awarded the 19th Annual Taiwan Architecture Award in 1997.

History
It was for passengers looking to visit Taiwan Grand Shrine on Jiantan Mountain. The shrine no longer exits; its former location is where the Grand Hotel currently stands. After the war, it was renamed Chientan station and then closed in the 1950s. The station location was where the Jiantan Youth Activity Center currently stands.

The Taipei Metro station was originally going to be constructed as two stations: one at the old TRA station location (R18) and another one called Mingchuan Station (R19). However, residents around the proposed Mingchuan Station opposed the plan. Thus, a station was constructed at the midpoint of the two proposed stations (hence the current station number R18A), and was opened on 28 March 1997.

Station layout

First and Last Train Timing 
The first and last train timing at Jiantan station  is as follows:

References

1997 establishments in Taiwan
Tamsui–Xinyi line stations
Railway stations opened in 1915
Railway stations opened in 1997